Athiémè is a town and arrondissement located in the Mono Department of Benin. The commune covers an area of 220 square kilometres and as of 2013 had a population of 56,483 people.

References

Communes of Benin
Arrondissements of Benin
Populated places in the Mono Department